Prof Kathleen Janette Anderson OBE FRSE FRCC (1927–2002) was a 20th century Scottish biochemist, highly involved in the transition of Napier College into Napier University.

She was appointed Vice Principal of Edinburgh's Napier University in 1983, becoming the first woman to be appointed to such a senior post in a Scottish university.

Life
She was born in July 1927.

She was raised in Glasgow and educated at Queen's Park School, Glasgow before studying Biology at Glasgow University.

In 1972 she oversaw Napier University's first major grant-aided study: looking at the impact of Edinburgh's sewage system on the ecology of the Firth of Forth.

Anderson was a biologist who was a Fellow of the Royal Society of Edinburgh, Fellow of the Institute of Biology, Fellow of the Royal College of Chemistry, Fellow of the Scottish Vocational Education Council and was awarded an OBE in 1987 for services to education.  She developed the first interdisciplinary degree course at Napier College (now Edinburgh Napier University) and also significantly contributed to the development of research within the university.

In 1995 she was elected a Fellow of the Royal Society of Edinburgh.

In later life she was a Director of St George's School for Girls in west Edinburgh. Her address at this time was 40 Barony Terrace.

She died of a pre-existing heart condition on 5 July 2002.

Family

She was married to Mark and they had one son and one daughter.

Career

Academic 
 Lecturer in botany at West of Scotland College of Agriculture
 Research Fellow and Lecturer in biochemistry
 Senior lecturer at Napier College
 Vice-principal at Edinburgh Napier University

Directorship of companies  
Anderson was director of the following companies:
 Napier University Ventures Limited 1988 - 1992	 
 Scottish Vocational Education Council 1989 - 1992 
 St George's School for Girls 1990- 2000 
 The Royal Observatory (Edinburgh) Trust 1991- 1999
 The Thomas Telford Trust

Publications

References 

Fellows of the Royal Society of Edinburgh
Officers of the Order of the British Empire
British women biologists
1927 births
2002 deaths
20th-century British women scientists
Scottish women scientists
20th-century British biologists